Luqiao, Sichuan is a town in the Garzê Tibetan Autonomous Prefecture of Sichuan, China, and forms the urban centre of Luding County.  Luqiao's population is concentrated along the Dadu River at the edge of the Daxue Mountains.

References 

Populated places in the Garzê Tibetan Autonomous Prefecture
Towns in Sichuan